Abdelrahman Fawzy (August 11, 1909 – October 16, 1988) was an Egyptian professional football player and manager, who played as a centre forward.

He played for Al-Masry SC and Zamalek SC (where he spent most of his career) as well as the Egypt national football team. He took part at the 1934 FIFA World Cup, where he scored twice for Egypt in their 4–2 loss against Hungary, which was the first time (and the only time before 1970) that an African team had competed at the FIFA World Cup. He was thus, the first African footballer to score at the World Cup. He would have been the first African to score a hat trick at the World Cup (a feat not yet achieved by any African footballer to date) but his third goal was disallowed. The Egyptian goalkeeper that day, Mustafa Mansour, later said:

"When the game was 2–2, my colleague Fawzy took the ball from the centre and dribbled past all the Hungarian players to score a third goal. But the referee cancelled the goal as an offside!"

Early life 
Fawzy was born in the Egyptian city Port Said, Khedivate of Egypt on 25 May 1911.

Club career

Al-Masry 
Fawzy began his career in 1928 with his hometown club, Al-Masry SC. He played with the club till 1934, a total of 6 seasons. He won with them the Sultan Hussein Cup 2 times (1933, 1934) and the Canal Zone League 3 times (1932, 1933, 1934).

Zamalek 
In 1935, Fawzy moved to Cairo-based club Zamalek SC (then known as El Mokhtalat and then Farouk) where he spent most of his career, as he played there until his retirement in 1947, playing with them a total of 12 seasons. He won with them the Egypt Cup 5 times (1935, 1938, 1941, 1943, 1944) and the Cairo League 5 times (1939–40, 1940–41, 1943–44, 1944–45, 1946–47).

International career 
Fawzy played for the Egypt national team. He was among the team that competed in the 1934 World Cup qualifiers, in which Egypt won 11–2 on aggregate of the two matches against the Mandatory Palestine national team, with seven goals in the match that was held in Cairo, which ended with a score of 7–1 and four goals in the match that was held in Jerusalem, which ended with a score of 4–1, with Fawzy scoring the fourth goal for Egypt.

At the 1934 FIFA World Cup, Fawzy participated in the match against Hungary and scored two goals as the match ended 4–2 in favor of Hungary. Mustafa Mansour, Egypt's goalkeeper at that match, stated that Fawzy scored the third goal for Egypt, when the result was a 2–2 tie between the two teams, but the referee canceled it for an offside offence despite him playing the ball from the centre of the field. Fawzy is the first ever African footballer to score at the FIFA World Cup. He is also Egypt's top goalscorer at the World Cup with 2 goals.

Managerial career 
In 1946, right after retiring from playing, Fawzy became the manager of his former club Zamalek SC (known as Farouk until 1952). In 1953, while managing Zamalek, Fawzy became the manager of the Egypt national football team. Fawzy led the Egypt national team to win the 1953 Pan Arab Games football tournament with a 4–0 victory over Syria in the final. Unlike his performance as a player, they failed to qualify to the 1954 FIFA World Cup after losing their two matches against Italy in the qualification rounds, after that Fawzy was no longer the manager of the Egypt national football team, after one year in that position. In 1956, Fawzy became the first ever manager in the history of Egyptian football to manage two clubs at the same time as he managed Ghazl El Mahalla, playing in the Egyptian Second Division at that time, alongside him managing Zamalek. He led Ghazl El Mahalla, in that season, to their first ever promotion to the Egyptian Premier League. He then resigned from his position at Ghazl El Mahalla, after only one season with them, as well as his position at Zamalek after 10 years of managing the team, making him the longest-serving manager in the history of Zamalek. With Zamalek, Fawzy won the Egypt Cup 2 times (1952, 1955) and the Cairo League 5 times (1946–47, 1948–49, 1950–51, 1951–52, 1952–53), a total of seven titles, making him the most successful manager in the history of Zamalek. In 1957, Fawzy became the first manager of the Saudi Arabia national football team, after the establishment of the team in 1956, and he stayed with them for 5 years until 1962. In 1960, while managing the Saudi Arabia national football team, Fawzy became the manager of Egyptian club El Sekka El Hadid, he stayed with them for only one season, leaving in 1961. After leaving the Saudi Arabia national football team in 1962, Fawzy took a 13 years hiatus, before coming back to manage El Sekka El Hadid for one more season in 1975. After that, Fawzy retired from football altogether.

Personal life 
Fawzy is the father of Major General Dr. Hazem Fawzy, the former head of Financial Affairs department in the Egyptian Armed Forces Finance Authority.

Former board member of Zamalek SC during the period of club president Hassan Amer from 1984 to 1988, and during the period of club presidents Hassan Abo Elfottoh and Nour Eldally from 1988 to 1992, former board member of the Egyptian football association (EFA) during the period of EFA president Farouk Abo Elezz in 1988, and former member of the board of Automobile & Touring Club of Egypt during the period of the president Mokbel Shaker from 2002 to 2004.

Also, he is the father of Major General Dr. Ahmed-Sherin Fawzy, the former governor of Monufia from 2013 to 2015.

Former chairman of Telmisr Company, one of the largest companies in the Middle  East, for producing electric and electronic equipments from 96 to 1999, and he was a Captain in the Egyptian air force during October war in 1973, former board member of Zamalek SC during the period of club president Hassan Abo Elfottoh from 1988 to 1990, former board member of Zamalek SC during the first period of club president Galal Ibrahim 1992 to 1996, and former board member of Zamalek SC during the second period of club president Galal Ibrahim, from 2010 to 2011.

Also, he is the father of Muhammad Fawzy, the former agent of the Accountability State Authority and the Table Tennis Federation chose Mohamed Abdel Rahman Fawzy, a former member of the board of directors of Zamalek SC during the period of club president Kamal Darwish, to head the Giza region till now.

Also, he is the father of Major General Dr. Ezz-Aldein Fawzy, the former medical attache for the Egyptian embassy in London, United Kingdom and the former agent of the Egyptian General Intelligence Directorate.

Also, he is the father of Dr. Gamal Fawzy, the former agent of the Egyptian General Intelligence Directorate and the resident doctor for the Egyptian president Abdel Fattah el-Sisi in the Heliopolis Palace.

Death 
Fawzy died on 16 October 1988 in Cairo, Egypt at the age of 78. One week after his death, Zamalek SC's administration named the club's covered arena by his name in his honor, the Abdulrahman Fawzi Hall. Just one year later, Egypt qualified to their second World Cup.

Career statistics

International

International statistics 

Notes

International goals

Honours

Player 
Al-Masry

 Sultan Hussein Cup (2): 1933, 1934
 Canal Zone League (3): 1932, 1933, 1934

Zamalek

 Egypt Cup (5): 1935, 1938, 1941, 1943, 1944
 Cairo League (5): 1939–40, 1940–41, 1943–44, 1944–45, 1946–47

Manager 
Zamalek

 Egypt Cup (2): 1952, 1955
 Cairo League (5): 1946–47, 1948–49, 1950–51, 1951–52, 1952–53

Egypt

 Pan Arab Games football tournament: 1953

See also
African nations at the FIFA World Cup
Egypt at the FIFA World Cup

References

1909 births
1988 deaths
Al Masry SC players
Zamalek SC players
Egyptian footballers
Egypt international footballers
1934 FIFA World Cup players
Zamalek SC managers
Saudi Arabia national football team managers
Sportspeople from Port Said
Association football wingers
Egyptian football managers
Egyptian expatriate football managers
Expatriate football managers in Saudi Arabia
Egyptian expatriate sportspeople in Saudi Arabia